Hammatoderus emanon is a species of beetle in the family Cerambycidae. It is known from Nicaragua, Costa Rica, and Panama. It was originally described by Dillon and Dillon in 1941 as Plagiohammus emanon, but later combined into the genus Hammatoderus, thus making the current binomial name Hammatoderus emanon.

References 

Hammatoderus
Beetles described in 1941